Orla Kilkenny is a camogie player, a member of the Galway senior panel that unsuccessfully contested the All Ireland finals of 2010 and 2011 against Wexford and winner of an All Star award in 2010.

Other awards
Senior Gael Linn Cup 2008, National Camogie League 2003 and 2005. three senior All Ireland Club Championships, two Ashbourne Cup medals with UL, one All Ireland Minor, two club All-Ireland sevens.

References

External links
 Camogie.ie Official Camogie Association Website

1983 births
Living people
Galway camogie players
UL GAA camogie players